"Think of Laura" is a popular song by the American Grammy Award-winning singer-songwriter Christopher Cross. Released as a single in late 1983 from Cross's second studio album, Another Page, "Think of Laura" became the singer's fourth (and, to date, final) single to reach the Top 10 on the Billboard Hot 100 chart, where it peaked at No. 9 in early 1984. The song spent eleven weeks in the Top 40. In addition, the song became Cross's third single to hit No. 1 on the adult contemporary chart, following "Never Be the Same" and "Arthur's Theme (Best That You Can Do)". "Think of Laura" remained at No. 1 on this chart for four weeks. The song was written by Cross and produced by Michael Omartian.

Background 
Cross wrote the song to mourn the death of Denison University college student Laura Carter, who was killed in Columbus, Ohio, when she was struck by a stray bullet during gunfire in a gang war.

Carter, a lacrosse player from Wayne, Pennsylvania, was sitting in the back seat of her father's car. Her family was visiting for homecoming, and had just watched Laura and her friends compete in a lacrosse match.

Cross had met Carter through her college roommate Paige McNinch, whom Cross was dating at the time. McNinch was pictured on the inner sleeve of the Another Page album, sitting on a stool. Cross wrote the song as a way of offering comfort to McNinch, and honoring Carter's memory. 

Carter's shooter, Gordon Newlin, served time for the shooting. He was released on parole in 2012.

"Think of Laura" has a relatively straightforward arrangement, with the singer's vocals and a piano accompaniment. The lyrics express the sorrow felt by those who knew the woman but ask that she be remembered with happiness: When you think of Laura, laugh, don't cry / I know she'd want it that way.

General Hospital  
The song's chart popularity was primarily due to the ABC soap opera General Hospital. One of the program's supercouples, Luke and Laura, were quite popular, and the song came to be associated with the character Luke's love for Laura, who had been missing (and presumed dead) for many months. Notes of the song became a recurring motif as the character of Laura was mentioned (and eventually returned). When interest in the song grew because of its prominence on the show, it was released as a single. 

ABC did not ask for Cross's permission to use the song and never paid him for using it.

Cover versions
The song has been covered by American R&B group Boyz II Men, their version entitled "The Aaliyah Song", as a tribute to the late singer Aaliyah.

Charts

See also
List of number-one adult contemporary singles of 1984 (U.S.)

References

1983 singles
1983 songs
Christopher Cross songs
General Hospital
Song recordings produced by Michael Omartian
Songs written by Christopher Cross
Commemoration songs
Warner Records singles